This is a list of schools in Tongzhou District, Beijing.

Secondary schools
Note: In China the word 中学 zhōngxué, literally translated as "middle school", refers to any secondary school and differs from the American usage of the term "middle school" to mean specifically a lower secondary school or junior high school. 初中 chū​zhōng is used to refer to a lower secondary school.

 Beijing Luhe International Education Campus (北京潞河国际教育学园)
 Beijing Modern Music School (北京市现代音乐学校)
 Beijing Xincheng Vocational School (北京新城职业学校) - Songzhuang Campus (宋庄校区) and Zhu Campus (主校区)
  Tongzhou Branch School (北京市育才学校通州分校)
  Tongzhou Campus (通州校区) 
 Beijing City Tongzhou District Lihua School (北京市通州区立华学校)
 Beijing City Tongzhou District Liyuan School (北京市通州区梨园学校)
 Beijing City Tongzhou District Lixinzhuang School (北京市通州区陆辛庄学校)
 Beijing City Tongzhou District Majuqiao School (北京市通州区马驹桥学校)
 Beijing City Tongzhou District Niubaotun School (北京市通州区牛堡屯学校)
 Beijing City Tongzhou District Peizhi School (北京市通州区培智学校)
 Beijing City Tongzhou District Taihu School (北京市通州区台湖学校)
 Beijing City Tongzhou District Teacher Research Center Affiliated School (北京市通州区教师研修中心实验学校)
 Beijing City Tongzhou District Xinhua School (北京市通州区新华学校)
 Beijing City Tongzhou District No. 2 High School (北京市通州区第二中学)
 Beijing City Tongzhou District No. 4 High School (北京市通州区第四中学)
 Beijing City Tongzhou District No. 6 High School (北京市通州区第六中学)
 Beijing City Tongzhou District Beiguan High School (北京市通州区北关中学)
 Beijing City Tongzhou District Chaichantun High School (北京市通州区柴厂屯中学)
 Beijing City Tongzhou District Ciqu High School (北京市通州区次渠中学)
 Beijing City Tongzhou District Dadushe High School (北京市通州区大杜社中学)
 Beijing City Tongzhou District Gantang High School (北京市通州区甘棠中学)
 Beijing City Tongzhou District Kuoxian High School (北京市通州区漷县中学)
 Beijing City Tongzhou District Langfu High School (北京市通州区郎府中学)
 Beijing City Tongzhou District Longwangzhuang High School (北京市通州区龙旺庄中学)
 Beijing City Tongzhou District Luhe High School (北京市通州区潞河中学)
 Beijing City Tongzhou District Luhe High School Affiliated School (北京市通州区潞河中学附属学校)
 Beijing City Tongzhou District Mizidian High School (北京市通州区觅子店中学)
 Beijing City Tongzhou District Songzhuang High School (北京市通州区宋庄中学)
 Beijing City Tongzhou District Xiaowu High School (北京市通州区小务中学)
 Beijing City Tongzhou District Xiji High School (北京市通州区西集中学)
 Beijing City Tongzhou District Yongle High School (北京市通州区永乐店中学)
 Beijing City Tongzhou District Yujiawu High School (北京市通州区于家务中学)
 Beijing City Tongzhou District Yunhe High School (北京市通州区运河中学) - Junior High School Division (初中部) and Senior High School Division (高中部)
 Beijing City Tongzhou District Yuqiao High School (北京市通州区玉桥中学)
 Beijing City Tongzhou District Zhangjiawan High School (北京市通州区张家湾中学)
 High School Affiliated to Beijing Institute of Technology Tongzhou Campus (通州校区)
  Tongzhou Campus (通州校区)
 High School Affiliated to Renmin University of China Tongzhou Campus (通州校区)

Primary schools

Private schools
 Beijing Shuren Ribet Private School

References

Tongzhou
Schools